In the run-up to the 1959 general election, various polling organisations conducted opinion polling to gauge voting intention amongst the general public. Such polls, dating from the previous election in 1955 to polling day on 8 October 1959, are listed in this article.

Graphical summaries

Polling results 

In the run-up to the 1959 United Kingdom general elections, various organisations carry out opinion polling to gauge voting intention. Results of such polls are displayed in this article.

The date range for these opinion polls are from the 1955 general election til the 1959 general election.

1959

1958

1957

1956

1955 

Opinion polling for United Kingdom general elections